The 1957 municipal election was held November 3, 1957 to elect a mayor and five aldermen to sit on Edmonton City Council and four trustees to sit on the public school board (Michael O'Byrne, Orest Demco, Catherine McGrath, and Joseph Moreau were acclaimed to two-year terms on the separate school board).  The electorate also decided seven plebiscite questions.

The election would normally have fallen on October 16 (the third Wednesday in October), but was delayed because of the provincial plebiscite on October 30.

There were ten aldermen on city council, but five of the positions were already filled: Frederick John Mitchell, Ethel Wilson, Laurette Douglas, Giffard Main, and Donald Bowen were all elected to two-year terms in 1956 and were still in office.

There were seven trustees on the public school board, but three of the positions were already filled: J. Percy Page, John Thorogood, and William Orobko were elected to two-year terms in 1956 and were still in office.  The same was true on the separate board, where Vincent Dantzer, John Bernard Kane, and Leo Lemieux were continuing.

Voter turnout

There were 49955 ballots cast out of 141532 eligible voters, for a voter turnout of 35.3%.

Results

(bold indicates elected, italics indicate incumbent)

Mayor

Aldermen

Public school trustees

Separate (Catholic) school trustees

Plebiscites

Fluoridation of Water

Shall fluorides, for the prevention of tooth decay, be added to the City water supply sufficient to bring the fluoride content of City water up to the level of one part fluoride to one million parts of water?
Yes - 30420
No - 16626

Paving

Shall Council pass a bylaw creating a debenture debt in the sum of $965,000.00 for the City share of standard paving of arterial and residential streets?
Yes - 22182
No - 5022

Parks

Shall Council pass a bylaw creating a debenture debt in the sum of $200,000.00 for the improvement of City parks and the commencement of work on unsubdivided park land, circles, buffer zones, ravine side boulevards and similar works?
Yes - 20202
No - 6479

Traffic Lights

Shall Council pass a bylaw creating a debenture debt in the sum of $100,000.00 in order to purchase and install additional traffic lights at various locations within the City?
Yes - 21048
No - 5692

Library

Shall Council pass a bylaw creating a debenture debt in the sum of $100,000.00 in order to construct and equip a branch of the Edmonton Public Library in a location within the City?
Yes - 15287
No - 10521

Royal Alexandra Hospital

Shall Council pass a bylaw creating a debenture debt in the sum of $250,000.00 to provide necessary renovations to the existing portion of the Royal Alexandra Hospital and equipment for the Hospital?
Yes - 21258
No - 5657

Fire Hall

Shall Council pass a bylaw creating a debenture debt in the sum of $245,000.00 in order to build and provide equipment for a Fire Hall at 98th Street and 101A Avenue?
Yes - 18418
No - 7696

References

City of Edmonton: Edmonton Elections

1957
1957 elections in Canada
1957 in Alberta